Roudaki Metro Station is a station in Tehran Metro Line 7. It is located on the western side of Navvab Expressway at the junction with Imam Khomeini Street.

References 

Tehran Metro stations